Aşağıçakmak is a village in the Keban District of Elazığ Province in Turkey. Its population is 73 (2021). The village is populated by Kurds and is the village of Cemîl Bayik.

References

Villages in Keban District
Kurdish settlements in Elazığ Province